Football Days is a 2003 Spanish comedy film written an directed by David Serrano which stars Ernesto Alterio, Alberto San Juan, Natalia Verbeke, and María Esteve.

Cast

Production 
The film was produced by Telespan 2000 and Estudios Picasso.

Release 
Distributed by Buena Vista International, the film was theatrically released in Spain on 16 September 2003.

Accolades 

|-
| rowspan = "11" align = "center" | 2004 || rowspan = "5" | 18th Goya Awards || Best New Director || David Serrano ||  || rowspan = "5" | 
|-
| Best Actor || Ernesto Alterio || 
|-
| Best New Actor || Fernando Tejero || 
|-
| Best New Actress || Nathalie Poza || 
|-
| Best Editing || Rori Sáinz de Rozas || 
|-
| rowspan = "6" | 13th Actors and Actresses Union Awards || Best Film Actor in a Leading Role || Ernesto Alterio ||  || rowspan = "6" | 
|-
| Best Film Actor in a Secondary Role || Fernando Tejero || 
|-
| Best Film Actor in a Minor Role || Secun de la Rosa || 
|-
| Best Film Actress in a Minor Role || rowspan = "2" | Nathalie Poza || 
|-
| Best New Actress || 
|-
| Best New Actor || Fernando Tejero || 
|}

See also 
 List of Spanish films of 2003

References

External links 

2003 comedy films
2003 films
Spanish comedy films
Films produced by Ghislain Barrois
2000s Spanish films
2000s Spanish-language films
Telecinco Cinema films